Catgirl or "nekomusume" is a female character with cat ears or other traits on an otherwise human body.

Catgirl or Cat Girl may also refer to:

 Cat Girl, a 1957 British-American fantasy film
 Catgirl (DC Comics), a fictional character
 Carrie Kelley in The Dark Knight Strikes Again 
 Kitrina Falcone, a Catwoman supporting character
 Duela Dent, a Batman supporting character

See also 
 List of catgirls
 
 
 Catwoman (disambiguation)
Cat and Girl, a 1999 webcomic
 Bakeneko, a Japanese yōkai, a cat that has changed into a supernatural creature
 Nekomata, a Japanese yōkai